Jake Maltby (born 24 May 2000) is an English footballer who plays as a midfielder for Silsden and Farsley Celtic on a dual registration arrangement.

Career
He made his senior debut on 7 November 2017, in a Football League Trophy game.

He joined Farsley Celtic in summer 2019.

He joined Silsden on a dual registration in October 2020.

Career statistics

References

2000 births
Living people
English footballers
Association football midfielders
Bradford City A.F.C. players
Farsley Celtic F.C. players
Silsden A.F.C. players
National League (English football) players